Bardas Phokas may refer to:
 
Bardas Phokas the Elder (c. 878 – c. 968), Byzantine general and father of emperor Nikephoros II Phokas
Bardas Phokas the Younger (died 13 April 989), Byzantine general and rebel, son of Leo Phokas the Younger